The 2012 Rally Italia Sardegna was the penultimate round of the 2012 World Rally Championship season and was held between 18 and 21 October 2012. It was based in Olbia, Sardegna.

The rally was also the seventh round of the Production World Rally Championship.

Results

Event standings

Special Stages

Power stage
The "Power stage" was a  stage at the end of the rally.

References

External links
 Rally official website
 Rally Italia at WRC.com
 Rally Italia at eWRC.com
 Rally Italia at JUWRA.com

Sardegna
Rally Italia Sardegna
Rally di Sardegna